This article lists the performances of each of the 23 national teams which have made at least one appearance in the World Baseball Classic. The 2006 and 2009 tournaments, each had the same 16–team field, chosen by invitation. Beginning with the 2013 tournament, the four last-place teams from the previous tournament's first round each contested a qualifying round against three additional teams. The outcome of this process has been that 14 of the original 16 teams have continued to appear in every tournament. In 2013, Canada and Chinese Taipei re-qualified while Panama and South Africa were respectively replaced by Brazil and Spain. In 2017, Australia and Mexico re-qualified while Brazil and Spain were respectively replaced by Colombia and Israel.

The three teams to have won the tournament are Japan (2006, 2009), the Dominican Republic (2013), and the United States (2017). Other teams to have reached the championship game are Cuba (2006), South Korea (2009), and Puerto Rico (2013, 2017). Other teams to have reached the semifinals are the Netherlands and Venezuela. Other teams to have reached the second round are Chinese Taipei, Israel, Italy, and Mexico. The United States is the current World Baseball Classic champion, defeating Puerto Rico at the 2017 World Baseball Classic Final.

Debut of national teams
The 2009 tournament is the only World Baseball Classic in which every team had appeared in at least one of the previous tournament. Prior to all 16 teams that participated in the 2006 tournament were invited to the tournament that year. The total number of teams that have participated in the World Baseball Classic until the 2023 edition is 23.

Overall team records
. Teams in bold are part of the 2023 World Baseball Classic.

Medal table

Comprehensive team results by tournament
Legend
 – Champions
 – Runners-up
 – Third place
 – Fourth place
QF – Quarterfinals (2023–present)
R2 – Round 2 (2006–2017: second round)
R1 – Round 1 (2006–2017: first round, 2023–present: pool stage)
 – Relegated to qualification tournament
Q – Qualified
 – Did not qualify
 – Did not enter

Results of host nations
Since the WBC's format allows multiple nations to host different rounds of the event, seven different nations have hosted at least one round through the first four iterations of the tournament. Records of each nation when playing on its home soil are listed below.

The following table lists the teams who've earned the most wins against host countries.

Results of finalists

Results by confederation
This is a summary of the best performances of each confederation in each tournament.

Number of teams by confederation
This is a summary of the total number of participating teams by confederation in each tournament.

External links
Official website

World Baseball Classic
Baseball-related lists